Taibet is a town and commune, and the capital of Taibet District, in Touggourt Province, Algeria. According to the 2008 census it has a population of 20,174, up from 14,322 in 1998, and a growth rate of 3.6%.

Geography

Taibet lies at an elevation of  surrounded by the palm trees of its oasis, one of many scattered oases lying between Touggourt and El Oued. Beyond the oasis are the sand dunes of the Grand Erg Oriental desert.

Climate

Taibet has a hot desert climate (Köppen climate classification BWh), with very hot summers and mild winters, and very little precipitation throughout the year.

Transportation

Taibet is connected by short local roads to the N16, which connects the town to Touggourt  to the west and El Oued  to the northeast.

Education

4.0% of the population has a tertiary education, and another 11.5% has completed secondary education. The overall literacy rate is 63.1% (second lowest in the province), and is 75.9% among males and 50.4% among females (also the second lowest in the province).

Localities
The commune is composed of 17 localities:

Taïbet
حي  المناصرية 
Taïbet El Gueblia
Bahdi
Oumih Chargui
Oumih Lemcif
El Khoubna I
El Khoubna II
Matmat
Hassi Ouled Zid
Amiche
Ouglet Mabrouka
El Bania Malah Saada
Retmia
Dlila
Bakar
Djouini

References

Neighbouring towns and cities

Communes of Ouargla Province
Cities in Algeria
Algeria